Kenan Kodro (born 19 August 1993) is a Bosnian professional footballer who plays as a forward for Nemzeti Bajnokság I club Fehérvár and the Bosnia and Herzegovina national team.

Kodro started his professional career at Real Sociedad B, who loaned him to Lagun Onak in 2012. Two years later, he switched to Osasuna. In 2017, he joined Mainz 05, who sent him on loan to Grasshoppers in 2018. Later that year, Kodro was transferred to Copenhagen. The following year, he moved to Athletic Bilbao, who loaned him to Real Valladolid in 2021. Later that year, he signed with Fehérvár.

Kodro made his senior international debut for Bosnia and Herzegovina in 2017, earning 11 caps since.

Club career

Early career
Kodro started playing football at a local club Antiguoko, before joining youth academy of his hometown club Real Sociedad in 2008. He made his professional debut and scored his first professional goal playing for Real Sociedad B in 2011. In February 2012, he was sent on a six-month loan to Lagun Onak.

Osasuna
In the summer of 2014, Kodro switched to Osasuna. He made his official debut for the side on 23 August against Barcelona B. On 18 October, he scored his first goal for Osasuna against Tenerife, which secured the victory for his team.

In February 2015, he extended his contract until June 2018.

Mainz 05
In June 2017, Kodro moved to German outfit Mainz 05 on a four-year deal. He made his competitive debut for the club in DFB-Pokal game against Lüneburger Hansa on 12 August. A week later, he made his league debut against Hannover 96.

In February 2018, Kodro was loaned to Swiss side Grasshoppers until the end of season. He scored his first career hat-trick in a triumph over Lugano on 21 April.

Copenhagen
In July, Kodro was transferred to Danish club Copenhagen for an undisclosed fee. He debuted officially for the team in UEFA Europa League qualifier against KuPS on 12 July. Four days later, he made his league debut against Horsens. On 26 July, he scored his first goal for Copenhagen against Stjarnan. Kodro scored his first hat-trick for the club on 2 August. On 7 October, he scored his first league goal in a defeat of Randers.

Athletic Bilbao
In January 2019, Kodro joined Athletic Bilbao on a contract until June 2022. He debuted competitively for the side on 10 February against Barcelona. On 16 March, he scored his first goal for Athletic Bilbao in a victory over Atlético Madrid.

In January 2021, he was loaned to Real Valladolid for the remainder of campaign.

Fehérvár
In August, Kodro signed a three-year deal with Hungarian outfit Fehérvár. He played his first official game for the team on 28 August against MTK Budapest and managed to score a brace.

International career
In March 2017, Kodro received first senior call-up to Bosnia and Herzegovina, for a 2018 FIFA World Cup qualifier against Gibraltar and a friendly game against Albania. He debuted against the latter on 28 March.

On 3 September, in a 2018 FIFA World Cup qualifier against Gibraltar, Kodro scored his first senior international goal.

Personal life
Kodro's father Meho was also a professional footballer. They became the first son and father to represent Bosnia and Herzegovina internationally.

Career statistics

Club

International

Scores and results list Bosnia and Herzegovina's goal tally first, score column indicates score after each Kodro goal.

References

External links

1993 births
Living people
Footballers from San Sebastián
Spanish people of Bosnia and Herzegovina descent
Citizens of Bosnia and Herzegovina through descent
Bosnia and Herzegovina footballers
Bosnia and Herzegovina international footballers
Bosnia and Herzegovina expatriate footballers
Association football forwards
Real Sociedad B footballers
CA Osasuna players
1. FSV Mainz 05 players
Grasshopper Club Zürich players
F.C. Copenhagen players
Athletic Bilbao footballers
Real Valladolid players
Fehérvár FC players
Segunda División B players
Tercera División players
Segunda División players
La Liga players
Bundesliga players
Swiss Super League players
Danish Superliga players
Nemzeti Bajnokság I players
Expatriate footballers in Germany
Expatriate footballers in Switzerland
Expatriate men's footballers in Denmark
Expatriate footballers in Hungary
Bosnia and Herzegovina expatriate sportspeople in Spain
Bosnia and Herzegovina expatriate sportspeople in Germany
Bosnia and Herzegovina expatriate sportspeople in Switzerland
Bosnia and Herzegovina expatriate sportspeople in Denmark
Bosnia and Herzegovina expatriate sportspeople in Hungary